Scared Stiffs is an adventure published by West End Games in 1987 for the light-hearted role-playing game Ghostbusters, itself based on the movie of the same title.

Contents
The Ghostbusters (player characters) are going to be the guest speakers at the first annual convention of the Quasi-Unearthly Association of Clairvoyants, Kismetologists and Spiritologists (QUACKS for short), but soon find themselves at the center of an alien plot to steal Earth's ghosts.

Publication history
Following the success of the 1984 movie Ghostbusters, West End Game published the licensed role-playing game in 1986, and immediately followed that with two adventures the same year, Hot Rods of the Gods and Ghost Toasties. A third adventure, Scared Stiffs was released in 1987, a 32-page softcover book with a cardstock map, written by John M. Ford and Bill Slavicsek, with interior art by Timothy Meehan and cover art by Fred Ottenheimer.

Reception
Graeme Davis reviewed Scared Stiffs for White Dwarf #92, and stated that "A nice adventure, exactly in the spirit of both film and game, Scared Stiffs is well worth a look from all Ghostmasters. But then you didn't need me to tell you that."

Other reviews
Gateways Vol. 2 Issue 5 (August 1987, p.27)

References

Ghostbusters (role-playing game)
Role-playing game adventures
Role-playing game supplements introduced in 1987
Works by John M. Ford